Steven Yilmar Zamora Palomino (born August 20, 1989) is an Ecuadorian footballer who plays for C.D. El Nacional.

Club career
Zamora's career started when he played for Azogues in youth level. After Azogues' disappointing 2008 season, they were relegated to the Serie B of Ecuador with Zamora not even playing one game for the first team.

On July 14, 2009, Zamora signed with Macará on loan until the end of the season. His debut game came against Barcelona in his team's 3-1 loss.

International career
Zamora played in the Ecuador U-20 team for the 2009 South American Youth Championship in Venezuela.

References

1989 births
Living people
Sportspeople from Guayaquil
Association football midfielders
Ecuadorian footballers
C.S.D. Macará footballers
C.S.D. Independiente del Valle footballers
Barcelona S.C. footballers